The Kayhausen Boy is a mummy, naturally preserved in a sphagnum bog in Lower Saxony, Germany. He is one of the few recorded bog children discovered.

Discovery and examination
The body, of a boy believed to have been approximately seven to ten years of age at the time of his death, was found in 1922. The boy is estimated to have died between 300 and 400 BCE. His arms and feet were bound together with cloth torn from clothing and a fur cape. Examination concluded that he had been stabbed three to four centimeters deep, three times in the neck and once on his left arm. It is thought that the wound on the boy's arm had happened when the boy may have raised his arm in an act of self-defense towards his attacker. 

A recent examination of the body shows that the weapon used to kill the child was a dagger with a four centimeter blade. A possible reason for the boy's demise is that he had suffered from an infected socket at the top of his femur, and hence would not have been able to walk without assistance. Because of the high incidence of deformities among bog bodies, such as the Yde Girl, anthropologists have suggested that the disabled were sacrificed because they were considered to be unfavored by their gods. The boy's body is preserved in a formalin solution and is not displayed.

See also
Bog body
Elling Woman
Grauballe Man
List of unsolved murders
Tollund Man
Windeby I
Yde Girl

References

1922 archaeological discoveries
1922 in Germany
Archaeology of Lower Saxony
Bog bodies
Deaths by stabbing in Germany
Disability studies
Iron Age Germany
Year of birth unknown
Year of death uncertain